"Do You Hear" is a song by Australian alt-pop group Cub Sport (then known as Cub Scouts), released in March 2012 as the second single from the group's second EP Told You So.
 
At the 2012 Queensland Music Awards, "Do You Hear" won Song of the Year and Pop Song of the Year.

Music video

"Do You Hear"s music video was released in April 2012. It was directed and produced by Sam Rogers and shows band members wearing prison jump suits and riding disability scooters around Brisbane.

References

 

Cub Sport songs
2012 singles
2012 songs